Gilvam Pinheiro Borges (Brasilia, August 1, 1958) is a Brazilian sociologist and politician. He spent part of his youth in Brasilia, after which he moved to the state of Amapá.

In 1990, he became Federal Deputy elected by PRN. Two years later he became a member of the PMDB, in which capacity he competed in the election to the Senate. In 1994 he was elected Senator for Amapá. In 1998, applied to the Governor of Amapá, but he left the race after standing 3rd place in the polls.

After the trial of Senator João Capiberibe (In a case of purchase of votes in the election of 2002), Gilvam Borges took the vacancy in the Senate again as the first-alternate of the plate of the merge.

References

1958 births
Living people
Members of the Federal Senate (Brazil)
Brazilian Democratic Movement politicians
Members of the Chamber of Deputies (Brazil) from Amapá
Christian Labour Party politicians